Arthur Nazarian (born 1951) is a Lebanese businessman and Member of Parliament of Armenian descent. He was the Ministry of Energy in the national unity government headed by Prime Minister Tammam Salam. He has held minister positions in two government agencies, Environment from 1998 to 2000 and Tourism. He was elected in the 2009 elections as a candidate of the Tashnag party, without any opponent in Beirut's second district for one of the Armenian Orthodox seats. He is a member of the Armenian General Benevolent Union.

Biography
Nazarian was born in Beirut in 1951. He pursued his university studies in the United States, where he graduated as a textile engineer in 1973. He works in trade and industry, and owns several companies in the Gulf. He was appointed Minister of Tourism and Environment in the government of Prime Minister Salim Hoss in 1998, the first government under President Emile Lahoud. He was elected member of the Parliament in 2009. He is the former Minister of Energy & Water.

Personal life
Nazarian married Tamar Kalaijian. They have three sons, Gary, Alex, & Peter.

References

Members of the Parliament of Lebanon
Energy ministers of Lebanon
Environment ministers of Lebanon
Tourism ministers of Lebanon
Water ministers of Lebanon
Lebanese people of Armenian descent
1951 births
Living people
Politicians from Beirut
Businesspeople from Beirut
Armenian Revolutionary Federation politicians